Hames-Boucres is a commune in the Pas-de-Calais department in the Hauts-de-France region of France.

Geography
A village located 6 miles (9 km) southwest of Calais, at the junction of the D215 and D231E2.

History
The commune was created from the two former parishes of Hames and Boucres in 1819. The two parish churches were located almost opposite each other and separated only by a street. The church of Hames was demolished during the Revolution.
The English seized the castle in the 14th century, but it was retaken by Francis, Duke of Guise, who successfully claimed all of the Calais Pale for France in 1558.

Population

Places of interest
 The church of St.Martin, dating from the eighteenth century.
 A double feudal motte.
 A neoclassical château dating from the eighteenth century.
 The château Thélu.
 The Hermitage Château.

See also
Communes of the Pas-de-Calais department

References

Hamesboucres
Pale of Calais